Ron Vawter (December 9, 1948 – April 16, 1994) was an American actor and a founding member of the experimental theater company The Wooster Group. Vawter performed in most of the group's works until his death from a heart attack in 1994 at the age of 45.

Life and career
Vawter was born in Latham, New York, to Matilda (Buttoni) and Elton Lee Vawter. As a founding member of The Wooster Group, directed by Elizabeth LeCompte at the Performing Garage in downtown New York, Vawter originated roles in Rumstick Road, Nayatt School, Point Judith (an epilog), Route 1 & 9, Hula, L.S.D. (...Just the High Points...), Frank Dell's The Temptation of Saint Antony, North Atlantic, and Brace Up!. He appeared on video in Fish Story, and in the Group's video pieces White Homeland Commando and Flaubert Dreams of Travel but the Illness of His Mother Prevents It.

Vawter was a member of The Performance Group, from which The Wooster Group emerged in 1980. With The Performance Group, Vawter performed in Mother Courage and Her Children (Bertolt Brecht), The Marilyn Project (David Gaard), Cops (Terry Curtis Fox), and The Balcony (Jean Genet) -- all directed by Richard Schechner.  
 
In addition to his work over 15 years at the Performing Garage, Vawter appeared in films, including King Blank, Philadelphia, The Silence of the Lambs, and Sex, Lies, and Videotape, generally playing character roles. He also performed in theatre pieces by Richard Foreman, Jeff Weiss, and Mabou Mines.

Vawter explored themes of sexual identity in his 1992 work for the stage, Roy Cohn/Jack Smith, two linked monologues that contrast the characters of two gay men who died of AIDS.
The Jack Smith section was a re-creation of Smith's performance "What's Underground About Marshmallows?," and the Roy Cohn section was written by Gary Indiana.
It was directed by Greg Mehrten and created with Clay Shirky and Marianne Weems. The piece was released as a film directed by Jill Godmilow in which the sections were intercut.

Vawter's last piece of work was considered his artistic testament: the Philoktetes-variations, written by John Jesurun on Vatwer's request, and performed while the actor was dying of HIV/AIDS. Based on the story about Philoctetes—the ancient Greek warrior whose wound smelled so intolerably noxious that he was banished to the uninhabited island of Lemnos and abandoned by his comrades-in-arms on the way to Troy—it has consequently also become a metaphor for AIDS, with Philoktetes as a plagued outcast.

In director Jan Ritsema's triptych at the Brussels Kaaitheater in 1994, Vawter embodied Philoktetes in three forms, using his own body naked and covered with purple Kaposi rash. Through his visible being, he illuminated the connection between the performance's "here and now" and the story's "there and then," as well as between life and death, subject and object—as in his first audience address, when Vawter said that he was suffering from AIDS: "I am dying; I am on my way to the grave but am just doing this performance on the way."

Vawter was a graduate of Siena College, where he performed in Little Theater productions.  Vawter died of a heart attack on April 16, 1994, in-flight on a commercial plane from Zürich to New York. He was 45.

Ron Vawter's papers are held by the New York Public Library for the Performing Arts.

Filmography

References

External links

 Ron Vawter papers, 1963-1994, held by the Billy Rose Theatre Division, New York Public Library for the Performing Arts

1948 births
1994 deaths
American male film actors
American gay actors
Siena College alumni
20th-century American male actors
People from Latham, New York
20th-century American LGBT people
Deaths from heart disease